Great Oakley Cricket Club Ground is a cricket ground in Great Oakley, Northamptonshire.  The first recorded match on the ground was in 1960, when the ground held Northamptonshire Second XI played the Surrey Second XI in the Second XI Championship.  The ground has played host to a total of 14 Second XI fixtures involving the Northamptonshire Second XI.

In 1990, the ground held a single Women's One Day International between England women and Ireland women.

In local domestic cricket, the ground is the home venue of Great Oakley Cricket Club.

References

External links
Great Oakley Cricket Club Ground on CricketArchive
Great Oakley Cricket Club Ground on Cricinfo

Cricket grounds in Northamptonshire
Sports venues completed in 1960